Viacheslav Ivanovich Grachev (born 22 April 1973 in Tashkent, Soviet Union) is a former Russian rugby union player and a current coach. He played as a number eight.

Grachev played in France for US Montauban, Bayonne and Pau, until a severe injury who almost put an end to his career in 2008. He recovered to play for Aviron de Bizanos for the season of 2011/12.

He had 72 caps for Russia, from 1993 to 2011, scoring 17 tries, 85 points on aggregate. He was called for the 2011 Rugby World Cup, where he was the vice captain. He played in three games. He was the oldest player of the competition, aged 38 years old.

References

1973 births
Living people
Russian rugby union players
Russia international rugby union players
Russian expatriate rugby union players
Expatriate rugby union players in France
Russian expatriate sportspeople in France
Rugby union number eights
Russian rugby union coaches